Shana Grebo (born 9 November 2000) is a French athlete specialising in the 400 m hurdles.

Grebo won the gold medal at the 400 m hurdles at the 2021 French Athletics Championships in Angers with a time of 56.841. She won a silver medal in the 4 x 400 meters relay at the 2021 European Athletics U23 Championships in Tallinn.

Since September 2021, Grebo has been training with the University of Oregon in Eugene in the United States where she also studies.

References

External links
 

2000 births
Living people
French female hurdlers
World Athletics Championships athletes for France
20th-century French women
21st-century French women
Oregon Ducks women's track and field athletes